Halet Çambel (27 August 1916 – 12 January 2014) was a Turkish archaeologist and Olympic fencer. She was the first woman with a Muslim background to compete in the Olympic Games.

Private life
Çambel was born in Berlin, German Empire on 27 August 1916, to Turkish military attaché Hasan Cemil Bey (Çambel), a close associate of Mustafa Kemal Atatürk, founder of the Turkish Republic, and Remziye Hanım, the daughter of Ibrahim Hakki Pasha, a former Grand Vizier (prime minister of the Ottoman sultan) and the Ottoman ambassador to the German Empire at the time.

She completed her secondary education at Arnavutköy American High School for Girls (today Robert College). During the high school years, she was inspired by her history of art teacher, who organized visits to historic sites of Istanbul. It was at this time that she began to perform fencing. Between 1933–1939, she was educated in archaeology at Sorbonne University in Paris, France. Çambel became a scientific assistant at Istanbul University in 1940. In 1944, she received a doctorate. From 1947 on, Çambel served as lecturer. She was a visiting scholar for two years at University of Saarbrücken in Germany.  In 1960, she was appointed professor and founded the Institute of Prehistory. She became emeritus in 1984.

On returning to Istanbul after the 1936 Summer Olympics, where she represented her country, she started a relationship with Nail Çakırhan, a communist poet and journalist, who became a celebrated architect. They were married for seventy years until the death of Nail Çakırhan in October 2008.

Çambel died at age 97 in Istanbul on 12 January 2014. Following a memorial ceremony held at Istanbul University's Faculty of Letters, she was taken to Akyaka, Muğla, where she was interred beside her spouse's grave.

Sports
She competed in the women's individual foil event at the 1936 Summer Olympics. Çambel was the first Muslim woman to compete in the Olympics. Although invited by a "female German official" to meet Adolf Hitler, Çambel refused it because of Hitler's mistreatment of Jews.

Professional career
After World War II, Çambel began studying with German archaeologist Helmuth Theodor Bossert (1889–1961), who was professor for archaeology at Istanbul University. In 1947, Bossert and she began excavating Karatepe, the walled city of 12th century BC late Hiitite king Azatiwada, located at the Taurus Mountains in southern Turkey. She played a key role in the decryption of Hittite hieroglyphics with the help of the Phoenician alphabet after their discovery of Karatepe Bilingual there.

Çambel was also active in promoting the preservation of Turkey's cultural heritage. In the 1950s, she resisted the government's attempt to move the artifacts from Karatepe to a museum. The government eventually agreed, and in 1960 established an outdoor museum, the Karatepe-Aslantaş Open-Air Museum, where her husband Nail Çakırhan designed some buildings. She also fought efforts to dam the Ceyhan River, which would have flooded many archaeological sites. She was able to have the proposed water level reduced sufficiently to save the sites.

Çambel as elected to the American Philosophical Society in 1979. In 2004, she received the Prince Claus Award in the Netherlands. The jury report cited her "for conducting rescue excavations of endangered heritage sites, introducing stone restoration and ensuring proper conservation of significant cultural heritage in Turkey," for founding a chair of Prehistoric archaeology at Istanbul University, and "for her dedicated scholarship and for her unique role in expanding the possibilities for interaction between people and their cultural heritage."

References

External links
 
 

1916 births
2014 deaths
Alumni of Arnavutköy American High School for Girls
Fencers at the 1936 Summer Olympics
Fencers from Berlin
Hittitologists
Istanbul University alumni
Academic staff of Istanbul University
Olympic fencers of Turkey
Academic staff of Saarland University
Turkish archaeologists
Turkish female foil fencers
Turkish female martial artists
University of Paris alumni
Turkish women archaeologists
Ottoman expatriates in Germany
Members of the American Philosophical Society